Shtetl is a 1996 American documentary film that was produced and directed by Marian Marzynski. The film aired April 17, 1996 on the Frontline series on PBS.  The film recounts the history of the Polish village of Brańsk that had a substantial population of Jewish residents.  During World War II the Germans occupied the village of Brańsk and sent 2,000 Jews to the Treblinka extermination camp.  The film also examines the role of Polish anti-Semitism during the German occupation of Poland and lingering anti-Semitism during documentaries filming.

See also
Virtual Shtetl
Return to My Shtetl Delatyn

References

External links
Vimeo - Shtetl
 Shtetl: Part I (1996)
 Shtetl: Part II (1996)
Shtetl on Frontline

American documentary films
Ashkenazi Jews topics
Jewish Polish history
1996 films
1996 documentary films
Frontline (American TV program)
1990s American films